Dutchess Community College (SUNY Dutchess, Dutchess, or DCC) is a public community college in Dutchess County, New York. It is one of 30 community colleges within the State University of New York system (SUNY).

Over 60 academic programs are offered, the majority of which are geared toward associate degrees or certificates. In addition, the Office of Workforce Development and Continuing Education provides non-credit courses, High School Equivalency completion through preparation for the Test Assessing Secondary Completion (TASC) exam, ESL classes, and workforce training to residents of Dutchess County and beyond.

One-third of all Dutchess County college-bound high school graduates attend Dutchess Community College each year. The majority of alumni live and work in the Hudson Valley, and many have become civic and community leaders.

History 
In 1957, the college was founded on the site of a former tuberculosis hospital, which is now Bowne Hall, the campus's main administrative building. In 2007, Dutchess Community College marked its 50th anniversary of operations. Since enrolling its first class in 1957, DCC has awarded degrees and certificates to over 30,000 graduates and has provided educational opportunities for many thousands of other students.

On 25 August 2012, Conklin Hall was opened, becoming the college's first (and to date only) on-campus residence hall. At , it houses 467 students in 98 suites.

Academics

Academic departments 
The academic offerings of Dutchess Community College are organized into nine main departments:
 Allied Health and Biological Sciences
 Behavioral Sciences
 Business, Aviation and Construction Professions
 English and Humanities
 History, Government, and Economics
 Mathematics and Computer Sciences
 Nursing
 Performing, Visual Arts and Communications
 Physical Sciences, Engineering and Technology

Academic support services 
Dutchess Community College has a variety of academic support services available to its student body. These services range from tutoring to programs geared towards helping minority students succeed, and include:
 The Math & Science Center
 The Writing Center
 Office of Accommodative Services (offering disability support) 
 Educational Opportunity Program (EOP)
 The Collegiate Science and Technology Entry Program (CSTEP)

Main campus 
Nearly all of DCC's eleven main campus buildings are situated on top of a large hill.

 The Allyn J. Washington Center for Science & Art, which also contains the campus' only art gallery
 Bowne Hall, which holds all the central administrative offices on the campus
 Conklin Hall, the only on-campus residence hall, which also contains a secondary dining hall for the exclusive use of Conklin Hall residents
 Center for Business & Industry, commonly referred to as CBI
 Drumlin Hall, the main dining hall on campus
 Dutchess Hall, which contains the only theater, the campus bookstore, as well as multiple student lounges
 Falcon Hall, housing the campus gymnasium as well as a fitness center
 Hudson Hall houses the only library on campus, as well as the campus Writing Center
 Louis Greenspan Day Care Center
 Orcutt Student Services Center
 Taconic Hall

Conklin Hall, the Louis Greenspan Day Care Center, and Falcon Hall are the only three buildings not to be situated on top of the hill.

DCC @ Fishkill 
Nearly 20% of Dutchess Community College students attended school here. 

Prior to the current Fishkill location, Dutchess Community College had a satellite branch in Wappingers Falls, but it closed upon the opening of DCC @ Fishkill in 2021. DCC @ Fishkill has 20 multi-purpose classrooms, a versatile design, a fully equipped biology lab, and a networked computer classroom.

Student life 
Dutchess Community College has a variety of departments and programs dedicated to engaging students and promoting success, all of which are operated by the Department of Student Services. The Department of Student Services has, under its operating umbrella, offices including Health Services, Student Activities, Intercollegiate Athletics, Admissions, and Counseling Services, including many others. Health Services operate the on-campus health center and offers minor medical treatment to DCC students free of charge. The Office of Intercollegiate Activities is responsible for operating and maintaining all sports teams on campus. Sports available for men include soccer, basketball, and baseball. Women's sports include volleyball, softball, basketball, and starting in the fall of 2017, soccer. The Office of Student Activities manages student trips, guest speaker lectures, family festivals, on-campus events, the Student Government Association (SGA) and all on-campus clubs.

Presidents of Dutchess Community College
Since the founding of DCC in 1957, six people have held the title of President of Dutchess Community College. Dr. James F. Hall of Michigan was hired as the first president of the college in 1957. Dr. Pamela Edington, when appointed in 2014, became the first woman to hold the position. She retired in July 2020. Her permanent replacement, Dr. Peter Jordan, became the first person of color to serve as president of DCC in August 2021.

The presidents of the college are listed below in chronological order:

Dr. James Hall (1957–1972)
Dr. John Connolly (1972–1982)
Dr. Jerry A. Lee (1982–1992)
Dr. D. David Conklin (1992–2014)
Dr. Pamela R. Edington (August 1, 2014 – July 31, 2020)
Dr. Peter G. Jordan (August 2, 2021–present)

Community involvement

The Bridge Program 
In an effort to more effectively prepare students for college, as well as to draw more students to the college, DCC instituted the Bridge Program. This allows local high school students to take certain DCC classes on the campus. These classes are primarily entry-level English classes, but can range from government to calculus courses, depending on the proficiency of the student. While the majority of local high schools allow their students to travel to DCC for these classes, a few do not. One notable exception is Poughkeepsie High School, which only allows its students to take the college courses in the high school building itself. Teachers must be specially certified by both Poughkeepsie High School and by DCC in order for the classes to be counted as college credit.

The Charles E. & Mabel E. Conklin Scholarship for Academic Excellence 
Established in 2003, the Charles & Mabel Conklin Scholarship provides students with the full cost of tuition for four semesters at DCC. the scholarship is open to any graduating senior attending a high school in Dutchess County, provided that student places in the top 10% of their graduating class. Due to the high draw of this scholarship, Dutchess Community College attracts more top-10% students from Dutchess County than any other single college or university. 43 students were awarded the Charles E. & Mabel E. Conklin Scholarship in 2016.

Notable alumni 
 Bill Duke
 Mela Hudson
 Kima Jones
 Matthew Lee
 Marc Molinaro

Notable faculty and staff 

 Rita Kogler Carver
 Matt Finley
 Donald L. Klein
 George Tarantini
 Sumi Tonooka

References

External links 
Official website
Hudson River Valley Heritage website – photos and other documents from DCC's first 50 years

Dutchess Community College
NJCAA athletics